Paweł Rafał Rańda (born 20 March 1979 in Wrocław) is a Polish rower. He won a silver medal in lightweight coxless four at the 2008 Summer Olympics.

For his sport achievements, he received: 
 Golden Cross of Merit in 2008.

References 

1979 births
Living people
Polish male rowers
Olympic rowers of Poland
Rowers at the 2008 Summer Olympics
Rowers at the 2012 Summer Olympics
Olympic silver medalists for Poland
Sportspeople from Wrocław
Recipients of the Gold Cross of Merit (Poland)
Olympic medalists in rowing
Medalists at the 2008 Summer Olympics
Kazimierz Wielki University in Bydgoszcz alumni
World Rowing Championships medalists for Poland
European Rowing Championships medalists